Maren Caroline Henriette Schønberg Erken (6 November 1866 – 22 October 1953) was a popular Norwegian cookbook writer and teacher in home economics. One Norwegian newspaper included her in their list of the most important 100 Norwegians in the last 200 years.

Early life, education and career in home economics 

Erken was born Schønberg in Christiania (now Oslo). Her father Edvard Schønberg who was a professor in medicine put great emphasis on the importance of food and her mother was an accomplished cook from whom Henritte first learnt to prepare food.

Erken achieved a teaching position at a girls' school in 1893. To obtain better qualifications, she took courses in home economics in Norway and later she learned cookery in Berlin and Edinburgh. Starting in 1897, she wrote a regular column for the women's magazine Urd which mostly had readers of upper-class or upper middle-class background.

She married Albert Erken, an officer, in 1901. After living from 1904 to 1904 in Levanger, Central Norway where Henriette organised some courses in home economics, they settled at a farm in Vang in Eastern Norway. There Henriette started organising education in home economics. She offered courses for future housewives (Norwegian: husmorskole) and a school for aspiring teachers of home economics. She also held lectures and demonstrations all over the country; something she continued after she closed her educational programs in 1927. Her presentations often focused on making foods from cheap Norwegian products like milk and fish. She was also a proponent of whale meat and horse meat, although the latter suggestion achieved little success.

Publications 

Her first cookbook which was co-authored by Caroline Steen Kogebog for skole og hjem was published in 1895. Steen was a physician from Denmark who was prevented from practicing medicine in her home country because of her gender. Their book went through sixteen editions. Steen went on to be a professor of domestic science in Denmark.

Erkens book Stor Kokebok (English: Big Cookbook) was first published in 1914. The book had 700 pages and came in 18 new editions until 1951. In total it sold more than 200,000 copies. The same year she published a small booklet called Billig mat (Cheap food). An abridged version  of the large bookbook named Liten kokebok (English: Small cookbook) which was first published in 1931 sold 100,000 copies.

Erken provided recipes for physician Carl Schiøtz's 1939 book about healthy diet Trygg kost for norske hjem  which included information about the Oslo breakfast.

Awards and legacy 
Erken was awarded the King's Medal of Merit in gold in 1916.

The biography Henriette Schønberg Erken. En norgeshistorie sett fra kjøkkenbenken (English: Henriette Schønberg Erken. A history of Norway seen from the kitchen table) written by Maria Berg Reinertsen was published in 2013.

While her big cookbook was promoted as being based on recipes developed at Erken's kitchen, food columnist and chef Andreas Viestad has speculated that part of her books were copied from foreign cookbooks. He uses as an example her comprehensive writings on how to kill and prepare a turtle for soup, and questions whether there were any live turtles in Norway at that time.

In connection with the bicentenary of the Norwegian Constitution in 2014, a group of professionals put together by the newspaper VG named Erken the 99th most important person in Norwegian history in the period 1814–2014.

References 

1866 births
1953 deaths
Writers from Oslo
Norwegian food writers
Home economists
Women food writers
Norwegian women non-fiction writers
Norwegian columnists
Norwegian women writers
Women cookbook writers
Norwegian women columnists